Thomas Goddard Bergin  (November 17, 1904 – October 30, 1987) was an American scholar of Italian literature, who was "noted particularly for his research on  Dante's Divine Comedy and for its translation."  He was the Sterling Professor of Romance Languages at Yale University, and Master of Timothy Dwight College.  He is the first poet to have his words launched into outer space to orbit the earth.

Author, translator, editor 

He is recognized as an authority on Dante, Boccaccio, Petrarch, and the Provençal troubadours, as well as modern Italian writers, including Alberto Moravia, Salvatore Quasimodo, Giovanni Verga, and Giambattista Vico. Bartlett Giamatti referred to him as the “grand statesman of Italian scholarship in America.”

Among his translations are Dante's Divine Comedy (1948), which was published in three-volumes with illustrations by Leonard Baskin, Niccolò Machiavelli's The Prince (1947) and Giambattista Vico's New Science (1946) with Max Fisch.

He published scholarly texts and monographs on authors and the literature of renaissance Italy, France, Spain and Provençal.  His biography of the Italian author Boccaccio (1981) was considered a “notable book” of the year by the New York Times, and was a finalist in 1981 for the National Book Critics Circle Award. 

He edited The Taming of the Shrew for The Yale Shakespeare, and states in the introduction that his “basic principle was fidelity to the text” of the First Folio of 1623. This in part involved restoring many original wordings and punctuation that long editorial tradition had permitted to be altered.

He was  prolific; the bibliography of his works in Italian Literature: Roots and Branches (1976), lists thirty-seven books, fifteen contributions to books, fifty articles in periodicals, and almost 500 book reviews.

His book Dante (1965) was published during the 700th anniversary year of the birth of the Italian poet, a busy year for Bergin, during which he created a conference at Yale on Dante, he was the editor of the conference papers, which were published in book form as From Time to Eternity, and he travelled extensively lecturing on Dante.

Julius A. Molinaro, writing in "Forum Italicum", the journal of Italian studies, states that there must be few "who are not acquainted with some aspect of his work, for it touches many fields ranging ... from the Provencal troubadours to translations of contemporary Italian poetry.  Between these limits are a Dante concordance and invaluable books on Dante, Petrarch and Vico."

The Divine Comedy 

Thomas G. Bergin writes that The Divine Comedy "is everything: a personal confession, a vast love lyric, an encyclopedia of the knowledge of the Middle Ages ... and of course quite simply an absorbing narrative."  The Divine Comedy is made up of 14,233 lines, divided into three parts; Inferno, Purgatorio and Paradiso.  Thomas G. Bergin's English translation casts Dante's poem into blank verse.  It begins with these lines:

Yale 
The chapter written by Bergin in the book, My Harvard, My Yale, recounts how from an early age, he had a deep and abiding appreciation for Yale University.  He was born in New Haven, not far from the university, he attended public high school, and was awarded the only scholarship that was given each year by the town to a local boy to attend Yale.  He entered Yale as an undergraduate in 1921, just as the twenties were beginning to roar. He found there an invigorating academic environment, but also a social stratification that kept the students from more privileged backgrounds apart from the others.

Thomas G. Bergin wanted to make his mark at Yale, and recognized that academic achievement was a way open to him. He describes how he "came to enjoy learning" and by his senior year, he says, "it became for me an unadulterated rapture".

At this point—twenty years old and approaching graduation— an opportunity was presented to him, that would be his life's journey, and it would begin with a required sojourn in Florence, Dante's home.  But there was a parental figure who was determined to prevent him from taking this first step.  The story of his escape from home, up until the gangplanks are drawn up and the ship sets sail, as he relates it in the essay, "Endings and Beginnings", is a tale of suspense.

He earned his B.A. from Yale in 1925, traveled to Italy to study and live, and then returned to Yale to earn a Ph.D. in romance languages in 1929.  He taught at Yale College as a teacher of Italian from 1925 until 1930.  In 1949, he became head of Yale's Spanish and Italian Department, and the Benjamin Barge Professor of Romance Languages and Literature.

When Bergin returned to Yale after the war, he "could see at once how greatly the college system had improved life under the elms."  The college system that was introduced in the 1930s had the effect of solving the problem of social stratification by stirring up the social order and getting students from all backgrounds and experiences to live, study and be together—a richer social life became available to everyone. Another result was that the system of fraternities diminished. Thomas G. Bergin was appointed master of Timothy Dwight College in 1953. As Master, he presided over a community of young scholars who lived in the college.

As Master, he also hosted The Timothy Dwight Chubb Fellowship visits of notable people from various walks of life, including the Prime Minister of the United Kingdom from 1945 to 1951 Clement Attlee, conservative presidential candidate of 1964 Barry Goldwater, President Harry Truman, Adlai Stevenson, actor Fredric March, novelist Iris Murdoch, and future President Ronald Reagan.

When the visit by the conservative Californian candidate, Ronald Reagan, was announced, it stirred up controversy in the political atmosphere of 1967— there were those who wanted the invitation withdrawn.

William F. Buckley, Jr., who is described as a "life long friend" of Bergin, in spite of each man being on opposite ends of the political spectrum, weighed in on the controversy in his syndicated newspaper column.  Buckley, writing with what the Yale Daily News described as "tongue-in-cheek" referred to Bergin as "a scholar aesthete of obstinate liberalism."  Bergin responded by saying “I always enjoy Buckley’s prose.  For once I find it difficult to quarrel with him.”  Buckley was further inspired to imagine Bergin "lamenting the furor over his invitation to Reagan" with a quote from the Divine Comedy: “I cannot well report how I entered it, so full was I of slumber at that moment when I abandoned the true way.”

Bergin had a reputation as an impressive speaker with a striking wit. A few of the speeches that he gave as Master, along with other writings and notes posted on the bulletin board, were gathered together and published in the book Master Pieces, which was edited by Bartlett Giamatti and T. K. Seung.

In 1957 he became the Sterling Professor of Romance Languages and Literature, and when he retired in 1973 he became Sterling Professor Emeritus.

He was an unofficial historian of Yale in his book on Yale football, Gridiron Glory (1978), and in his column, "Time and Change", which was published regularly for twenty years in the Yale Alumni Magazine. He wrote of the Harvard/Yale football rivalry in his book The Game (1984).

In 1989, Yale established the Thomas Bergin scholarships for Italian majors, and the dining room of Timothy Dwight College was named in his honor.

World War II 

During the war, Major Bergin was assigned to the headquarters of the Allied Control Commission in Italy, where he served as director of public relations from 1943 to 1946. For his service during the war, Bergin was decorated with the Bronze Star, the Order of Civil Merit and the Order of Saints Maurice and Lazarus and Ordine della Corona d'Italia from Italy, and the Order of the British Empire.

He was stationed in the hills that overlooked the Bay of Naples and the Isle of Capri where the sun would set every night.  It was a time when the allied forces had arrived and were battling the enemy, from hill to hill, from the south to the north, leaving behind a bruised and traumatized country. His wartime experiences are expressed in verse in his book, Parco Grifeo.

Poet 

The New York Times referred to him as “a renowned Dante scholar and a wry poet in his own right”. His poems are published in books, magazines and quarterlies.

His poem, "Space Prober", became, on November 15, 1961, the first poem sent to orbit in outer space. The poem was inscribed on an instrument panel, and launched on a Transit Research and Attitude Control (TRAAC) Satellite, where it continues to orbit the earth at an altitude of 600 miles, and is expected to continue orbiting for the next 800 years.

Personal life 

Thomas G. Bergin, or "TGB" as he was sometimes known, was born in New Haven, Connecticut, on November 17, 1904, a child of Thomas Joseph Bergin and Irvinea Jane Frances Goddard Bergin.  Thomas Joseph Bergin graduated from Yale in 1896.  Thomas G. Bergin attended New Haven High School, and then Yale, where he received a B.A. in 1925 and a Ph.D. in romance languages in 1929.  He married Florence Bullen of Wallasey, England on December 30, 1929.

He taught at Yale College from 1925 until 1930, and was a professor of Spanish and Italian at Flora Stone Mather College of Western Reserve University from 1930 to 1935.  He then moved to Albany and taught romance languages at the New York State Teachers College.

He then went on to Cornell University from 1941 to 1948 where he was a professor of romance languages.

In 1943, he received an appointment to teach at the United States School of Military Government at Charlottesville, Virginia.

Thomas G. Bergin died on October 30, 1987, age eighty-three, at home in Madison, Connecticut. He was survived by his wife, who has since died; two daughters, Winifred Hart, of Lexington, Virginia and Jennifer von Mayrhauser of New York; six grandchildren, and eight great-grandchildren.

Honors 

Thomas G. Bergin's honors include the Dante and Petrarch Medals, the Yale Medal, the Wilbur Cross Medal, Honorary Officer of the Order of the British Empire, and the Bronze Star for his military service to his country during the war.  In recognition of his many contributions to Italian studies, the Italian government made him Commander of the Order of Civil Merit in 1969.  He received honorary degrees from Hofstra College in 1958, Fairfield University in 1965, and the State University of New York at Binghamton in 1984. He was awarded the Yale College DeVane Medal in 1975.

He was a member of the American Association of Teachers of Italian (president in 1947), the Medieval Academy of America, the Dante Society of America, the American Association of University Professors (president of the Yale chapter from 1951 to 1952), and PEN International.

Books 

Giovanni Verga (1931)
Modern Italian Short Stories (1938), editor
Luciano Zuccoli: ritratto umbertino (1940)Anthology of the Provençal Troubadours (1973), editor, with Raymond Thompson HillThree French Plays (1941), editor with R.T. HillSpanish Grammar (1943) textbook with G. DaleThe Autobiography of Giambattista Vico, by Vico (1944), translator with Max FischParco Grifeo (1946), verse wartime writingsThe Prince, Machiavelli (1947), translator and editorDante's "Inferno" (1948) translatorDante's "Purgatorio" (1953) translatorDante's "Paradiso" (1954) translatorDivine Comedy (1955) translator
 The Poems of William of Poitou (1955), translatorYale Shakespeare The Complete Works, The Taming of the Shrew (1954) editorThe Divine Comedy, by Dante Alighieri (1955), translator and editorTranslations from Petrarch (1955), editor, and translator with othersProcul Este a Gramine (1960)Almanac for Academics (1960)The New Science of Giambattista Vico, by Vico (1961), translator with Max FischBertran de Born (1964) translator, editorMaster Pieces (1964) edited by T. K. Seung and A. Bartlett GiamattiItalian Sampler (1964) translator, editorDante (1965)Approach to Dante (1965)The Sonnets of Petrarch (1965) translator, editorConcordance to the Divine Comedy (1965) editor with E. H. Wilkins, et alSonnets and Odes of Petrarch (1966) translator, editorPerspective on the Divine Comedy (1967)From Time to Eternity (1967) editorA Diversity of Dante (1969)The Divine Comedy (1969) translator, rev. trans.Dante: His Life, His Times, His Works (1970) translator, editorCervantes: His Life, His Times, His Works (1970) translator, editorPetrarch (1970)Dante's Divine Comedy (1971)On Sepulchres (1971), translator and editorAnthology of the Provençal Troubadours (1973), editor, along with Raymond Thompson HillBucolicum Carmen, by Petrarch (1974), translator and editorItalian Literature, Roots and Branches  (1976) ed. Kenneth Atchity Giose RimanelliAfrica (1977) translator with Alice S. WilsonGridiron Glory (1978)Boccaccio (1981)My Harvard My Yale (1982) ed. Diana Dubois, TGB contributing authorUnder Scorpio (1982)Yale's Residential Colleges; the First Fifty Years (1982)The Game: The Harvard-Yale Football Rivalry, 1875-1983 (1984)Old Provençal Primer (1984) co-author with Nathaniel B. SmithEncyclopedia of the Renaissance'' (1987) co-author with Jennifer Speake

References 

1904 births
1987 deaths
Cornell University faculty
Yale University alumni
Burials at Grove Street Cemetery
Translators of Dante Alighieri
Dante scholars
Yale Sterling Professors
Writers from New Haven, Connecticut
Yale University faculty
Order of Civil Merit members
PEN International
Honorary Officers of the Order of the British Empire
20th-century translators
20th-century American poets